The 1945 Delaware State Hornets football team represented the State College for Colored Students—now known as Delaware State University—as a member of Colored Intercollegiate Athletic Association (CIAA) in the 1945 college football season. The Hornets compiled a 4–3 record under coach Tom Conrad.

Schedule

References

Delaware State
Delaware State Hornets football seasons
Delaware State Hornets football